Tadeusz Hipolit Trojanowski (born 1 January 1933 in Straszów – 10 February 1997 in Warsaw) was a Polish wrestler who competed in the 1960 Summer Olympics.

Bronze medalist at the 1960 Summer Olympics in wrestling in 57 kg category (bantamweight).

External links
sports-reference

1933 births
1997 deaths
Olympic wrestlers of Poland
Wrestlers at the 1960 Summer Olympics
Polish male sport wrestlers
Olympic bronze medalists for Poland
Olympic medalists in wrestling
People from Kielce County
Sportspeople from Świętokrzyskie Voivodeship
Medalists at the 1960 Summer Olympics
20th-century Polish people